Jan Kubista is a Czechoslovakian Olympic middle-distance runner. He represented his country in the men's 1500 meters at the 1988 Summer Olympics. His time was a 3:46.41 in the first heat.

His son, also named Jan Kubista, is also a runner. His other son, Vojtěch Kubista, is a professional footballer.

References 

1960 births
Living people
Czech male middle-distance runners
Olympic athletes of Czechoslovakia
Athletes (track and field) at the 1988 Summer Olympics
Athletes from Prague